Longkesh is a small village in County Antrim, Northern Ireland, near Lisburn. In the 2001 Census it had a population of 201 people. It is situated in the Lisburn City Council area.

Places of interest 

Longkesh was the site of Long Kesh prison, later known as 'The Maze'. Formerly a Royal Air Force Base, the  prison hosted thousands of prisoners during The Troubles, several of whom died during a hunger strike. It has been announced that the prison will be redeveloped into a 'peace centre'.

See also 
List of villages in Northern Ireland
List of towns in Northern Ireland

References 

NI Neighbourhood Information System
A Long History

Villages in County Antrim